Bianka Lamade was the defending champion from 2001, but she chose not to compete in 2002.

Marie-Gaïané Mikaelian won the title in two sets over Tatiana Poutchek.

Draw

Seeds

  Marie-Gaïané Mikaelian (Winner)
  Tatiana Poutchek (finals)
  Tathiana Garbin (semi finals)
  Seda Noorlander (first round)
  Evie Dominikovic (first round)
  Fabiola Zuluaga (first round)
  Alena Vašková (first round)
  Milagros Sequera (first round)

Finals

Top half

Bottom half

References

Singles
2002 WTA Tour
2002 in Uzbekistani sport